Nyctus is a genus of skippers in the family Hesperiidae.

Species
The following species are recognised in the genus Nyctus:
 Nyctus crinitus Mabille, 1891
 Nyctus hiarbas (Cramer, 1775)

References

Natural History Museum Lepidoptera genus database

Hesperiinae
Hesperiidae genera